Asarta alpicolella is a species of snout moth in the genus Asarta. It was described by Philipp Christoph Zeller in 1839.  It is found in France and Switzerland.

The wingspan is 17–19 mm for males and 14–17 mm for females.

References

Moths described in 1839
Phycitini
Moths of Europe